Ernest Jouoa Grant (born May 17, 1976 in Atlanta, Georgia) is a former American football defensive tackle of the National Football League and Arena Football League. He was drafted by the Miami Dolphins in the sixth round of the 2000 NFL Draft. He played college football at University of Arkansas at Pine Bluff.

Grant was also a member of the Chicago Bears, Georgia Force and Utah Blaze.

References

1976 births
Living people
Players of American football from Atlanta
American football defensive tackles
Arkansas–Pine Bluff Golden Lions football players
Miami Dolphins players
Chicago Bears players
Georgia Force players
Utah Blaze players